Spanish Lookout is a settlement in the Cayo District of Belize in Central America. According to the 2010 census, Spanish Lookout had a population of 2,253 people in 482 households (2005 census has population is 2,300 and 2000 census had population is 1,786). Spanish Lookout is a community of Mennonites.

The Mennonite community in Spanish Lookout is quite modern: they use cars and other modern conveniences and the overall impression of the settlement is rather like rural North America than Central America or the Caribbean. The citizens of this community speak Plautdietsch as their mothertongue. Most also speak English and Spanish. It is largely an agricultural community with some light industry, furniture making, prefabricated wood houses and the only oil field in production in Belize.

History
In 1958 Kleine Gemeinde Mennonites from Mexico moved to Belize, creating the Spanish Lookout settlement. They objected to a new social welfare law in Mexico and arable land was more readily available in Belize. Over time, a number of families left for Manitoba and Nova Scotia, Canada. Nevertheless, the settlement's population of 1,108 in 1987 has more than doubled until 2010 through natural growth. In the 1980s, refugees arrived from Guatemala and El Salvador finding employment and schooling for their children within the settlement.

Location and geographic setting
Spanish Lookout is accessible via several roads, going north off the Western Highway. The main access to Spanish Lookout is via the Iguana Creek Bridge. The Central Farm entrance takes you across a river, via one of Belize’s two hand-cranked ferries equipped to transport vehicles. Several vehicles can fit on the ferry at once, while larger trucks may pass one or two at a time.

Climate
Spanish Lookout has a tropical climate, with little temperature difference between seasons, but a pronounced rainy season. The warmest month on average is May. The coolest month on average is January.

Economy
Spanish Lookout specializes in auto parts and is the country's leader in tire hardware and steel imports. It is a major producer of dairy products, poultry, vegetables and cattle produce, supplying the majority of the country with these commodities. The producer of Belize’s most popular chicken brand, Quality Poultry Products, is located at Spanish Lookout. Western Dairies, Belize’s only commercial producer of milk, is also located in the town. Country Foods is Belize's main supplier of eggs. As of 2006, Spanish Lookout has the only commercial oilfield within Belize.

Galeria

Literature
Heinrich Penner, John D. Reimer, Leonard M. Reimer: Spanish Lookout since 1958 - Progress in Action, Spanish Lookout 2008.

References

Canadian diaspora in North America
Populated places in Cayo District
Cayo North East
Kleine Gemeinde
Mennonitism in Belize
Mexican Belizean
Populated places established in 1958
Russian Mennonite diaspora in Belize
Ukrainian diaspora in North America